Kenneth Campbell Stott (born 19 October 1954) is a Scottish stage, television and film actor who won the Laurence Olivier Award for Best Actor in a Supporting Role in 1995 in the play Broken Glass at Royal National Theatre. He portrayed the dwarf Balin in The Hobbit film trilogy (2012–2014). 

His most notable roles in UK television include the title character DI John Rebus in the crime fiction-mystery series Rebus (2000–2007) and DCI Red Metcalfe in Messiah (2001–2005). He played Edward 'Eddie' McKenna in the Scottish BBC miniseries Takin' Over The Asylum (1994) co-starring with David Tennant, and Ian Garrett in the 2014 BBC TV mini-series The Missing alongside James Nesbitt.

Early life
Stott was born in Edinburgh. His mother, Antonia (née Sansica), was a Sicilian lecturer whose own father had previously been a priest. His father, David Stott, was a Scottish teacher and educational administrator. Stott was educated at George Heriot's School. For three years in his youth he was a member of a band called Keyhole, members of which later went on to form the Bay City Rollers. 

After attending Mountview Academy of Theatre Arts in London, Stott began working in the theatre for the Royal Shakespeare Company, but for some years his earnings from acting were minimal and he was forced to support himself by also working as a double glazing salesman. This is echoed in the character he plays in Takin' Over the Asylum.

Career
Stott's early work focused on theatre with a notable leading role in the dramatisation of Dominic Behan's play about the Northern Ireland troubles The Folk Singer (Belfast Lyric Theatre), where he also played the part of Judas in the first regional production of Jesus Christ Superstar directed by Michael Poynor (1973). Stott appeared in small roles in BBC series such as Secret Army (1977), The Complete Dramatic Works of William Shakespeare (King Lear, 1982), and Dennis Potter's The Singing Detective (1986). He also featured in an advert for the British COI's "Drinking And Driving Wrecks Lives" campaign, playing a fireman. He eventually began to earn starring roles on television in the 1990s. He created the leading role in The Prince's Play, a translation and adaptation by Tony Harrison of Victor Hugo's Le Roi s'amuse, for the National Theatre, London, 1996.

His highest-profile television roles have included hospital radio DJ Eddie McKenna in BBC Scotland's Takin' Over The Asylum the leading character, DCI Red Metcalfe, in the BBC crime drama series Messiah (BBC One, 2001–05); DI Chappell in ITV police drama The Vice (1999–2003); as a drunk who fantasises about finding redemption by joining the Salvation Army in Promoted to Glory (ITV, 2003); as Adolf Hitler in Uncle Adolf (ITV, 2005) and as a fictional Chancellor of the Exchequer in Richard Curtis's The Girl in the Café (BBC One, 2005). 2006 saw him take over the title character in detective series Rebus, a television adaptation of the Ian Rankin novels which had previously starred John Hannah. In 2008 Stott was nominated for a Scottish BAFTA for his performance as comedian Tony Hancock in BBC Four's Hancock and Joan. He played the father of cookery writer Nigel Slater in the BBC One adaptation of Slater's autobiographical novel Toast, opposite Helena Bonham Carter and Freddie Highmore. In 2015, Stott played Arthur Birling in Helen Edmundson's BBC TV adaptation of J. B. Priestley's An Inspector Calls.

On the big screen, he has tended to play mostly supporting parts, such as DI McCall in Shallow Grave (1994), Ted in Fever Pitch (1997), Marius Honorius in King Arthur (2004), an Israeli arms merchant in Charlie Wilson's War (2007) and Trufflehunter, a badger loyal to Prince Caspian in The Chronicles of Narnia: Prince Caspian (2008). However, he has had occasional starring roles in the cinema, most notably opposite Billy Connolly and Iain Robertson in The Debt Collector (1999) and Plunkett and Macleane of the same year. Most recently, he has starred as Balin in the live-action adaptation of The Hobbit, and played the role to critical acclaim.  Stott played a supporting role as Dexter Mayhew's father in One Day (2011) starring Anne Hathaway and Jim Sturgess.

Stott has continued to act on stage, and in 1997 was nominated for Best Actor at the Laurence Olivier Awards for his role in the Yasmina Reza play Art in which had appeared with Albert Finney and Tom Courtenay. In 2008 Stott starred in another West End production of a Reza play, this time God of Carnage, alongside Tamsin Greig, Janet McTeer and Ralph Fiennes at the Gielgud Theatre. He starred in a revival of Arthur Miller's A View From The Bridge at the Duke of York's Theatre in early 2009 and reprised his role of Michael in God of Carnage on Broadway (as a replacement for James Gandolfini) at the Bernard B. Jacobs Theatre in New York.

He returned to the Duke of York's Theatre in 2016 to play " Sir" (alongside Reece Shearsmith) in Ronald Harwood's The Dresser, to great critical acclaim.

He is a popular choice for voice work, as narrator for series such as Trawlermen, a documentary following North Sea trawlers, and Send in the Dogs, following the work of UK Police Officers and their canine partners.

Personal life
Stott has a son, David (born 1985), by his first marriage, which ended in divorce. He married his long-time partner the artist Nina Gehl in 2016. Stott is a supporter of Heart of Midlothian, with an irony in that the character portrayed by him, Ian Rankin's most well known character Inspector John Rebus, is portrayed as a Hibernian supporter in the television show.

Filmography

Awards and nominations

BAFTA TV Awards
0 win, 3 nominations

BAFTA Scotland Awards
2 win, 2 nominations

Laurence Olivier Awards
1 win, 4 nominations

Royal Television Society

0 wins 1 nomination

References

External links

1954 births
20th-century Scottish male actors
21st-century Scottish male actors
Alumni of the Mountview Academy of Theatre Arts
British people of Italian descent
Laurence Olivier Award winners
Living people
Scottish male Shakespearean actors
People educated at George Heriot's School
Male actors from Edinburgh
Royal Shakespeare Company members
Scottish male film actors
Scottish male radio actors
Scottish male stage actors
Scottish male television actors
Scottish male voice actors
Scottish people of Italian descent